Peter Gunn is an American private eye television series, starring Craig Stevens as Peter Gunn with Lola Albright as his girlfriend, Edie Hart. The series aired on NBC from September 22, 1958, to 1960 and on ABC in 1960–1961. The series was created by Blake Edwards, who, on occasion, was also writer (for 39 episodes) and director (for  nine episodes).

Peter Gunn is notable for being the first televised detective program whose character was created for television, instead of adapted from other media.

The series is probably best remembered today for its music, including the iconic "Peter Gunn Theme", which was nominated for an Emmy Award and two Grammys for Henry Mancini. Subsequently it was performed and recorded by many jazz, rock and blues musicians. The progressive rock band Emerson, Lake & Palmer recorded the song adding synthesizers. The series was number 17 in the Nielsen ratings for the 1958–1959 TV season and number 29 for the 1960-61 TV season.

Plot
Peter Gunn is a suave, well-dressed private investigator whose hair is always in place and who loves cool jazz. Whereas other gumshoes are often coarse and vulgar, Gunn is a sophisticate with expensive tastes. A contemporary article in Life noted that Edwards "deliberately tailored the part after the famous movie smoothie Cary Grant".

Gunn operates in a gloomy waterfront city, the name and location of which is not revealed in the series. He often visits Mother's, a smokey wharfside jazz club that Gunn uses as his "office", usually meeting new clients there. Gunn has a reputation for integrity and being among the best investigators; he has many reliable informants and is well-connected. His reputation is so good, the police occasionally ask him for help or advice. He sometimes works cases out of state and occasionally out of the country. Gunn was observed in "Murder on the Midway" as "wearing $30 shoes, a $200 suit and carrying a solid gold cigarette lighter". Gunn drives a 1958 two-tone DeSoto two-door hardtop in the first few episodes of the first season, then a 1959 Plymouth Fury convertible with a white top and a car phone. In the third season Gunn drives a 1960 white Plymouth Fury convertible with a car phone, later changing to a 1961 Plymouth Fury convertible.

Gunn's girlfriend, Edie Hart (Lola Albright), is a sultry singer employed at Mother's; she opens her own restaurant and nightclub in season 3, named Edie's. Gunn's pet name for Edie is "Silly". Herschel Bernardi costarred as Lieutenant Jacoby, a somber police detective and friend of Gunn who works at the 13th Precinct. Occasionally he refers people to Gunn as clients. In 1959, Bernardi received his only Emmy nomination for the role. Hope Emerson appeared as Mother, who had been a singer and piano player in speakeasies during Prohibition. She received an Emmy nomination for the role. For the second season, Mother was played by Minerva Urecal, following the departure of Emerson for a starring role in The Dennis O'Keefe Show. Associate producer Byron Kane portrayed Barney, the bartender at Mother's; Kane was not credited for playing this role. Bill Chadney appeared as Emmett, Mother's piano player. (Chadney and Albright were married in 1961.)

Both Billy Barty as pool hustler Babby and Herbert Ellis as Beat bistro owner, painter, and sculptor Wilbur, appeared in several episodes as occasional "information resources", as "Mother" also often is. Capri Candela played Wilbur's girlfriend, Capri. Morris Erby had the recurring role of Sgt. Lee Davis during all three seasons of the show. Frequent director Robert Gist appeared as an actor in different roles in three episodes. James Lanphier portrayed Leslie the maitre d'hôtel at Edie's restaurant and nightclub during season 3.

Cast

 Craig Stevens as Peter Gunn
 Lola Albright as Edie Hart, a lounge singer and Pete's girlfriend
 Herschel Bernardi as Lieutenant Jacoby, a police detective and friend of Gunn
 Hope Emerson as "Mother", a singer and piano player in speakeasies during Prohibition (Season 1)
 Minerva Urecal as "Mother" (Season 2)
 Byron Kane (uncredited) as Barney, the bartender
 Bill Chadney as Emmett, the piano player at Mother's
 Billy Barty as Babby, a pool hustler
 Herbert Ellis as Wilbur, beat bistro owner, painter, and sculptor
 Capri Candela as Capri, Wilbur's girlfriend
 Morris Erby as police Sgt. Lee Davis (seasons 1-3)
 James Lanphier as Leslie, maître d' (season 3)

Frequent director Robert Gist appeared as an actor in different roles in three episodes.

Episodes

Peter Gunn ran for three seasons starting in late 1958. A total of 114 episodes were produced during the three season run. Peter Gunn premiered on September 22, 1958 with the episode The Kill. The first season ran from September 1958 through June 1959 and contained 38 episodes.

Origin of series
Edwards developed Peter Gunn from an earlier fictional detective that he had created. Richard Diamond, Private Detective starred Dick Powell, and aired as a radio series from 1949 to 1953. David Janssen later starred in the television adaptation from 1957 to 1960. It was this character's success which prompted his creator to revisit the concept as Peter Gunn. Edwards had earlier written and directed a Mike Hammer television pilot for Brian Keith.

According to Blake Edwards, Gunn was "a present-day soldier of fortune who has found himself a gimmick that pays him a very comfortable living. The gimmick was trouble.  People who had major trouble will pay handsomely to get rid of it, and Peter Gunn was a man who will not only accept the pay but do something about it. He knows every element of the city, from cops to crooks.  He also, of course, has his soft side and will occasionally take on a charity job for free. But we'll never make the mistake of letting her [Edie] catch him. Never."

For the part of Edie, Edwards said, "We toyed at first with the idea of getting a name singer. But we soon realized it would be impractical to have a name singer cast in what is primarily a straight dramatic role. It wouldn't be fair, either to the singer or the audience. Once that idea was discarded, my first thought was Lola Albright. Lola had been going along well but not terribly well, if you know what I mean. But I'd always felt she had a potential that had never really been tapped.  She's sort of two beats off center in the way she talks and sings, and that's what we were looking for."

Henry Mancini said in 1992, "She was perfect casting for that role because she had an off-the-cuff kind of jazz delivery that was very hard to find."

Lola Albright said, "My whole career had been sort of ordinary. Peter Gunn changed all that." Albright said that Blake Edwards had her in mind from the outset, "But he had no idea I could sing. I had just recorded my first album."

In a 1993 interview, Craig Stevens talks about how he and co-star Lola Albright were hired for the show.

Initial plans called for the title of the program to be Gunn for Hire. The change to Peter Gunn occurred after officials at Paramount Pictures complained that the title was similar to that of the 1942 Paramount film This Gun for Hire.

Production
Besides those directed by Blake Edwards, other episodes were directed by Boris Sagal, Robert Gist, Jack Arnold, Lamont Johnson, Robert Altman  (for one episode) and several others. A total of 114 thirty-minute episodes were produced by Spartan Productions. Season one was filmed at Universal Studios, while seasons two and three were filmed at Metro-Goldwyn-Mayer. Philip H. Lathrop and William W. Spencer were cinematographers on many episodes. Craig Stevens' wardrobe was tailored by Don Richards and Lola Albright's fashions by Emeson's for 2 episodes (The Vicious Dog, The Blind Pianist) and by Jax for the remainder of the episodes. Wardrobe was not credited in episode 1, The Kill.

Music
The show's use of modern jazz music was a distinctive touch that helped set the standard for many years to come, with cool jazz themes accompanying every move Gunn made. The music, composed by Henry Mancini, was performed by a small jazz ensemble which included a number of prominent Los Angeles-based jazz and studio musicians. Trumpeter Pete Candoli, alto saxophonist Ted Nash, flutist Ronny Lang, trombonist Dick Nash, and pianist and future composer John Williams provided most of the improvised jazz solos. Williams plays the piano part on the title music ostinato.

Prominent jazz musicians occasionally made on-screen appearances. Trumpeter Shorty Rogers appeared in the episode titled "The Frog" playing flugelhorn as Lola sings "How High the Moon". Drummer Shelly Manne, in addition to performing on the soundtrack album, was credited with a Special Guest role in the 1959 episode "Keep Smiling" playing drums in the "Bamboo Club" combo. Brazilian guitarist Laurindo Almeida plays guitar as himself in the 1959 episode "Skin Deep".

In his autobiography Did They Mention the Music? Mancini stated: 

The "Peter Gunn Theme" became an instant hit, earning Mancini an Emmy Award nomination and two Grammys. The RCA Victor soundtrack album by Henry Mancini, The Music from Peter Gunn, was voted Album of the Year at the 1st Annual Grammy Awards in 1959 and reached No. 1 in Billboard's Pop LP Charts. The popularity of this album prompted RCA Victor to issue a second Mancini album of Peter Gunn music titled More Music from Peter Gunn. Bandleader Ray Anthony's recording of the theme music reached No. 8 on Billboard's Hot 100. Shelly Manne recorded two jazz albums of themes from the show in 1959, Shelly Manne & His Men Play Peter Gunn and Son of Gunn!!.

"The Peter Gunn Theme" has been recorded and performed by numerous musicians.

In 2019 Jasmine Records released a CD combining both Henry Mancini soundtracks of The Music of Peter Gunn and More Music from Peter Gunn.

The theme was also used in the Spy Hunter arcade video game, and has been used by the Kilgore College Rangerettes as the tryout music for their specialty jazz group since the 1960s.

Emmy nominations
The series was nominated for eight prime time Emmys without wins, all in 1959. They were for Best Dramatic Series - Less than One Hour, Craig Stevens as best lead actor in a drama, Herschel Bernardi as best supporting actor in a drama, Lola Albright and Hope Emerson as best supporting actress in a drama, Henry Mancini for best musical contribution to a television production, and Blake Edwards for best writing and direction of a single episode of a drama series.

Adaptations
The series made the transition to other media.  An original novel and a comic book adaptation were published by Dell Publishing in 1960. The novel, entitled Peter Gunn: Murder to a Jazz Beat, was written by Henry Kane. The 4-color comic book was Dell #1087, entitled "Peter Gunn", and had a photo cover with an introduction which said, "Pete tries to stop a postage stamp counterfeiter and gets a parcel of trouble - special delivery!" Lowell Toy Mfg. produced the "Peter Gunn Detective Game", a board game in 1960.

A feature film, Gunn, was released by Paramount Pictures in 1967, scripted by Edwards and William Peter Blatty and directed by Edwards with Stevens reprising the title role. A long-gestating ABC 90-minute pilot, Peter Gunn, aired in April 1989 was written, produced, and directed by Edwards and starred Peter Strauss in the lead role, but the network failed to order a series despite strong ratings and reviews.

In 2001, Edwards and his son, Geoffrey, joined with producers Jeffrey Tinnell and John Michaels and writer Norman Snider in developing an updated television series, The New Peter Gunn for Muse Entertainment in Canada. The project fell through when producers John Woo and David Permut began developing a big screen remake for Paramount with screenwriter W. Peter Iliff. Once Upon a Time in L.A. was pitched as a possible vehicle for John Travolta or Harrison Ford. Neither revival made it beyond the script stage.

TNT announced a new series was in development in May 2013 from producers Steven Spielberg, Julie Andrews, Lou Pitt, Justin Falvey and Darryl Frank with writers Scott Rosenberg, Jeff Pinkner, Josh Appelbaum, and André Nemec. The proposed series was not picked up for the 2014–2015 season.

In 2017, Paramount renewed its agreement with The Blake Edwards Estate with the intent of developing the property.

Media
From 1992 to 1996, Rhino Entertainment released various episodes of Peter Gunn on VHS cassettes. In 1999, Diamond Entertainment Corporation released a five-cassette set comprising ten episodes. Marathon Music & Video released a seven-cassette box set entitled "TV Cops and Private Eyes", in which an episode of Peter Gunn was included.

In 2002, A&E Home Video released two volume sets of Peter Gunn on DVD in Region 1, which comprise 32 episodes from Season One.  These releases used edited-for-syndication versions of episodes.

Timeless Media Group released Peter Gunn – The Complete Series on DVD in Region 1 in 2012. The 12-disc set features all 114 episodes of the series, as well as a bonus CD of Henry Mancini's score, The Music from Peter Gunn

References

External links

 
 
 

1958 American television series debuts
1961 American television series endings
1950s American crime drama television series
1960s American crime drama television series
1950s American mystery television series
1960s American mystery television series
American Broadcasting Company original programming
American action television series
Black-and-white American television shows
English-language television shows
Gunn, Peter
Films scored by Henry Mancini
NBC original programming
Television shows adapted into films
Television series by 20th Century Fox Television
American detective television series